Luis Morales may refer to:

Luis Morales (athlete) (born 1964), Puerto Rican track and field sprinter
Luis Morales (bishop) (1608–1681), Spanish Roman Catholic bishop
Luis Abanto Morales (1923–2017), Peruvian singer
Luis A. Morales (1928–2011), Puerto Rican politician
Luis de Morales (c. 1512–1586), Spanish painter
Luis Morales (cyclist), Uruguayan cyclist, represented Uruguay at the 2007 Pan American Games
Luis Morales (footballer), Venezuelan football (soccer) player, 1994 FIFA World Cup qualification
Luis Morales (volleyball), Salvadoran beach volleyball player, see 2008 NORCECA Beach Volleyball Circuit